MallePalli is a village located in East Godavari District, Gandepalli Mandal, in the state of Andhra Pradesh in India. It has a population of 12,000 people. Total voters in Mallepalli are around 7,500.

References

Villages in East Godavari district